Walc Stulecia (Polish for "Waltz of the Century") is a social science fiction novel published in 1998 by the Polish science fiction writer Rafał Ziemkiewicz. It was published in Poland by superNOWA. The novel received the prime Polish award for science-fiction literature, Janusz A. Zajdel Award, in 1998.

The book contrasts the society of Belle Époque and a fictional vision of a 21st-century society. Painted in a pessimistic tone, it follows the story of a game developer working on the game entitled "Walc stulecia".

External links
 Era widm (Review), Rzeczpospolita, 15.02.2010
 Review, polter.pl
 Review, sensja.pl

1998 novels
Polish science fiction novels
1998 science fiction novels
20th-century Polish novels
Novels by Rafał A. Ziemkiewicz
Belle Époque